Hieromantis sheni is a moth of the Stathmopodidae family. It is found in China (Chongqing, Hebei, Henan, Hubei, Jiangxi, Shaanxi, Shanxi, Tianjin, Yunnan, Zhejiang).

The wingspan is 7−10.5 mm.

References

Moths described in 2002
Hieromantis